Violeta Tomić, sometimes known in Slovenian as Violeta Tomič (born 22 January 1963) is a Slovenian television presenter and actress, serving as a deputy in the National Assembly. A member of Party Our Future, founded by Ivan Gale. She was chosen as the lead candidate of the European United Left–Nordic Green Left group ahead of the 2019 European Parliament election but was not elected.

References

1963 births
Living people
Politicians from Sarajevo
Actresses from Sarajevo
Slovenian people of Bosnia and Herzegovina descent